Taylor Signal Company-General Railway Signal Company is a historic industrial complex located in Buffalo, Erie County, New York. It was designed by the architectural firm of Esenwein & Johnson and built between 1902 and 1906. The daylight factory complex consists of a rectangular two and three-story brick factory building with a central light court and wings.  It has a three-story brick office building fronting on Elmwood Avenue and connected to the factory by a hyphen.  The office building features Gothic Revival style design elements.  The complex housed the Taylor Signal Company/General Railway Signal Company until 1907, when operations were moved to Rochester, New York.  Afterwards, it housed a number of manufacturing companies including the Century Telephone Construction Company, General Drop Forge Company, Curtiss Aeroplane and Motor Company, and Lippard-Stewart Motor Car Company. The complex has been renovated to house a hotel, banquet facility, and loft apartments.

It was listed on the National Register of Historic Places in 2014.

References

External links
Foundry Hotel and Banquet
Foundry Lofts

Industrial buildings and structures on the National Register of Historic Places in New York (state)
Gothic Revival architecture in New York (state)
Industrial buildings completed in 1906
Buildings and structures in Buffalo, New York
National Register of Historic Places in Buffalo, New York
Railway signaling in the United States
1906 establishments in New York (state)